Karizak-e Yaqubkhani (also Romanized as Kārīzak-e Yaʿqūbkhānī; also known as Kārīzak and Kārīzak-e Yaʿqūbī) is a village in Bagh-e Keshmir Rural District, Salehabad County, Razavi Khorasan Province, Iran. At the 2006 census, its population was 288, in 63 families.

References 

Populated places in   Torbat-e Jam County